The Rachel Carson House is a historic house in Colesville, Maryland, an unincorporated area near Silver Spring, Maryland.  Built in 1956, this typical suburban ranch-style house was where writer Rachel Carson wrote her classic work Silent Spring in 1962.  The house was designated a National Historic Landmark in 1991 for its association with Carson.

Description
The one-story house is typical of its era, finished in brick with an asphalt shingle roof. The interior, virtually unchanged since Carson lived there, contains a living room to the right of the entry, with Carson's study to one side, on the corner of the house. A kitchen and dining room are at the rear, behind the living room. Bedrooms are to the left of the entry. A basement contains a bedroom and bathroom and a multi-purpose room, as well as unfinished space.

Carson's original landscaping is largely intact, with only a small area of lawn. The wooded landscape of evergreens, azaleas and daffodils is in keeping with her desire to keep a "woody section" of the yard.

History
Designed by Carson and built for her use, the new home provided "all the special things that I need." She began writing Silent Spring at the house in 1958, rarely using the Maine cottage where she wrote The Edge of the Sea published in 1955. As Carson continued work on the book, the nature of the research, involving public documents and correspondence with scholars, and her own health encouraged her to spend more and more of her time at home in Silver Spring. After the publication of Silent Spring in 1962, Carson spent most of the next two years in Silver Spring before her death on April 14, 1964.

See also
Rachel Carson Homestead, her birthplace and childhood home in Springdale, Pennsylvania
List of National Historic Landmarks in Maryland
National Register of Historic Places listings in Montgomery County, Maryland

References

External links
Rachel Carson Landmark Alliance, the organization that preserves the house
, including photo in 2003, at Maryland Historical Trust
 Silent Spring, A Visual History curated by the Michigan State University Museum

Colesville, Maryland
House (Colesville, Maryland)
Houses completed in 1956
National Historic Landmarks in Maryland
Houses on the National Register of Historic Places in Maryland
Houses in Montgomery County, Maryland
National Register of Historic Places in Montgomery County, Maryland